Ticket Crystals is the seventh studio album by Bardo Pond. It was released on June 6, 2006. The album features a cover of The Beatles' song "Cry Baby Cry".

Reception
Like its predecessors, the album received largely positive reviews from critics. Fred Thomas of Allmusic found the "gentler" album to be "drenched in dubby reverb and delay, tucking its more menacing tones in layers of starlit musical wandering and resonating the most on subdued numbers like the sprawling "Isle" and a hazy reading of the Beatles' "Cry Baby Cry."" Jennifer Kelly of Popmatters considered the music to be "beautiful and [...] disturbing" in its combinations of "freak folk, drone and psychedelic metal." Gigwise hailed it as a "damn loud and a damn fine album", while Eric Hill of Exclaim! called it the band's best album since Lapsed.

More mixed reviews came from Cameron Macdonald of Stylus who found the band to be stylistically stagnating with the album, and criticized the closing track "Montana Sacra II" as being "[a] great opportunity squandered." In an otherwise positive review, Christian Maiwald of Ox-Fanzine found Sollenberger's vocals to be occasionally distracting & criticized the songs as being too short. Pitchfork'''s Mia Lily Clarke criticized the "overwhelming" use of flute & some of its "cloying prog mayhem."

A negative review came from Spanish magazine Mondosonoro'', which scored the album a 1 out of 10.

Track listing
"Destroying Angel" – 9:38
"Isle" – 11:13
"Lost Word" – 6:29
"Cry Baby Cry" (Lennon–McCartney) – 4:56
"FC II" – 18:16
"Moonshine" – 10:45
"Endurance" – 5:09
"Montana Sacra II" – 10:45

Personnel
Isobel Sollenberger – Flute, Violin, Vocals
Michael Gibbons – Guitar
John Gibbons – Synthesizer, Guitar, Percussion
Clint Takeda – Bass
Ed Farnsworth – Drums
Tom Greenwood – Guitar
Christina Madonia – Vocals

References

2006 albums
Bardo Pond albums
ATP Recordings albums